The Supreme Court of Judicature (Consolidation) Act 1925, sometimes referred to as the Supreme Court of Judicature Act 1925, was an Act of the Parliament of the United Kingdom.

Section 99
This section was replaced by section 84 of the Supreme Court Act 1981. The power conferred by this section was exercised by the Criminal Appeal (Reference of Points of Law) Rules 1973 (SI 1973/1114).

See also
Supreme Court of Judicature Act

References
Halsbury's Statutes,
The Public General Acts passed in the Fifteenth and Sixteenth Years of the Reign of His Majesty King George the Fifth. Printed by Eyre and Spottiswoode Ltd for the King's Printer. London. 1925. Volume II. Pages 1197 to 1334.

United Kingdom Acts of Parliament 1925